Gertrude Porsche-Schinkeová was a Czechoslovak luger of German ethnicity who competed during the mid-1930s. She won two bronze medals in the women's singles event at the European luge championships (1934, 1935).

References
 List of European luge champions 

Czechoslovak female lugers
Year of birth missing
Year of death missing
German Bohemian people
Czechoslovak people of German descent